The 1997 Australian Rugby League season was the 90th season of professional rugby league football in Australia, and the third season run by the Australian Rugby League. While several clubs had left the League to compete in the 1997 Super League season, twelve ARL-loyal teams – eight from across Sydney, two from greater New South Wales and two from Queensland – competed for the Optus Cup Trophy. The top seven teams then played a series of knock-out finals which culminated in a September grand final played in Sydney between the Manly-Warringah Sea Eagles and the Newcastle Knights. The fairytale came true for thousands of Novocastrians when the Newcastle club won their first ever premiership, staging a comeback from 8–16 to shatter Manly's hopes.

Pre season
The season is most notable for being run parallel to the rival Super League competition. This was the only season when the two competitions actually ran, notwithstanding that 1995 and 1996 had been disrupted by the Super League war.

ARL chairman Ken Arthurson resigned in February 1997 in an effort to enable re-unification negotiations held during the season to succeed. It would not be 'til after the season's end in December that the boards of every ARL club would gather at the SCG in an unprecedented meeting to consider the proposed peace deal following five months of secret negotiations between Ian Frykberg and Neil Whittaker.

Regular season
In 1997 the official player of the year award, the Provan-Summons Medal was won by Brad Fittler. This award was replaced by the Dally M Medal from the following year. The Illawarra Steelers' Scott Cram was named the 1997 season's rookie of the year.

The grand finals:

  Manly Sea Eagles vs  Newcastle Knights (Senior Grade)
  Balmain Tigers vs  Parramatta Eels (Reserve Grade)
  Balmain Tigers vs  Sydney City Roosters (Under-20s Grade)

The winners in all grades were:

  Newcastle Knights (Senior Grade)
  Parramatta Eels (Reserve Grade)
  Balmain Tigers (Under-20s Grade)

The test match

  Australia vs  Rest of the World

The State of Origin Series

  Queensland vs  New South Wales

Teams
The eight ARL teams that had aligned themselves with Super League were absent from this year's ARL premiership, instead spending the year competing in the new Telstra Cup competition. The Balmain Tigers changed their name back from the Sydney Tigers this season.

Ladder

(MP) - Minor Premiers
(P) - Premiers

Finals
Sydney City and North Sydney played out a bizarre Qualifying Final with the Roosters winning 33–21. The Roosters fought back from 14–2 down with 10 minutes to go to get it back to 14–14, then both sides kicked a field goal to send it to extra time at 15–15. The Roosters went on to play Gold Coast who were in their first ever finals campaign with the Roosters winning 32–10 to book a Preliminary Final showdown with Manly. A peculiarity of the finals system saw Manly and Newcastle face off in what later realised to be a pointless game where both the winner and loser progressed to a Grand Final qualifier the following week. The Roosters had another fight back when they came from 16–6 down to get it back to 16–16, but it was a Sea Eagles field goal that proved the difference to book themselves a third straight Grand Final berth with a 17–16 win.

Newcastle reached the 1997 grand final after defeating Parramatta in week one of the finals series.  At one stage, Parramatta lead the match 18–0 before a comeback gave Newcastle a 28–20 victory.  Newcastle then lost the following week to Manly 27–12 before setting up a preliminary final clash with North Sydney.

With the score 12–8 in favor of Newcastle with under 10 minutes to play Jason Taylor set up Michael Buettner for a try which made the score 12–12.  Normally a very reliable kicker and one of the most accurate in the competition, Taylor had already missed two previous conversions in the match but if he was to kick this goal it could send North Sydney through to their first grade final since 1943.  Taylor ended up missing the goal.  With the scores locked at 12–12, Newcastle player Matthew Johns kicked a field goal with 2 minutes to play to make it 13–12.  With only seconds remaining Norths frantically threw the ball around and lost it, the ball was swooped up by Newcastle's Owen Craigie and he raced away to score a try and won the game.

Grand Final

The fairytale came true for thousands of Novocastrians when the Knights won their first ever premiership, staging a comeback from 8–16 to shatter Manly's hopes.

1st half

The long-running duel between opposing front rowers Mark Carroll and Paul Harragon erupted once again in the 2nd minute when Carroll reacted to a Harragon shot on Geoff Toovey. Newcastle applied pressure early when they regained possession inside Manly's 20m and shortly after that Andrew Johns took a penalty attempt, but Manly's defence and luck stood firm and the score stayed nil-all. Manlyscored first after rookie hooker Anthony Colella won a scrum against the feed. John Hopoate exploited a weakness in Newcastle's right side defence and got between Darren Albert and Mark Hughes to score. Nevin's sideline conversion gave the Sea Eagles a 6–0 lead. In 13th minute Manly suffered a blow when Toovey was steamrolled. He left the field concussed for Cliff Lyons to come on.

Johns went within inches of scoring for Newcastle in the 24th minute when his blindside break on the last tackle was stopped by a desperate Hopoate. Manly responded with a thrilling try in the 25th minute. The movement started 55 metres out – Hopoate making the initial break down the left-hand side with Lyons backing up to enable Craig Innes to crash over for a Manly 10–0 lead. Newcastle's first points came through a Johns' penalty goal. Then in the 34th minute they scored their first ever Grand Final try after a clever kick from Matthew Johns was taken by Hopoate who was bundled into touch. From the scrum win, Robbie O'Davis got outside Terry Hill to score. Andrew Johns' conversion brought Newcastle within two points. Manly hit back in the 38th minute after some magical work from Lyons. He swept onto the ball which had been dropped by Harragon and spun around to find Shannon Nevin on the inside. The Newcastle forwards couldn't get across to cover the overlap and Nevin then converted his own try for a 16–8 half-time scoreline.

2nd half

Early in the second half there was more concern for Toovey after he was stomped on by Adam MacDougall. Manly then almost put Newcastle away in the 51st minute when Steven Menzies powered through close to the line only to be stopped by Troy Fletcher scrambling well to effect a try- and match-saving tackle for the Knights. Andrew Johns booted a penalty goal in the 57th minute to claw Newcastle back to within a converted try. In the 61st minute Adam Muir dropped a pass from Andrew Johns a metre from Manly's line but it was a sign that the Knights were back in the game. Manly on the other hand, began to play conservatively to their own ultimate cost. They received a penalty after another Harragon high tackle and elected to kick at goal 32 metres out with a swirling breeze. Nevin missed and Darren Albert returned the kick with a 40-metre run. Manly applied pressure for the next ten minutes but came away empty handed. Colella and then Nik Kosef both dropped balls inside Newcastle's 30m line while trying to off-load. A 69th minute last tackle raid ten metres out by Manly also fell short when a field-goal might have sealed the game. Having withstood the pressure, Newcastle then lifted. Following a long break by Fletcher, Andrew Johns received the ball from his brother. He stood in a tackle, handed to O'Davis, who spun and planted the ball on the line. Johns' conversion levelled the scores 16–16 with five minutes remaining.

The match is ultimately best remembered for its classic grandstand finish, when Darren Albert's try broke the 16–16 deadlock seven seconds from full-time. The effervescent Andrew Johns unexpectedly went down a narrow blind-side before slipping a pass to Albert who raced over to score prompting scenes of euphoria from the Knights fans and players who had won their inaugural title.  Ray Warren proclaiming "Newcastle have won the Grand Final"!

Newcastle Knights 22Tries: O'Davis 2, AlbertGoals: Johns 5/6

Manly Sea Eagles 16Tries: Hopoate, Innes, NevinGoals: Nevin 2/4

Clive Churchill Medal: Robbie O'Davis

Seventy per cent of the winning squad were Newcastle juniors. The win was a huge morale boost to the blue-collar Newcastle district in the same year that the area's biggest employer, the BHP steelworks had announced its closure.

Post game
A Super Bowl style match between the Newcastle Knights and Brisbane Broncos, the 1997 Super League season's premiers was mooted, but did not eventuate. Newcastle only had to wait another four years for its next premiership, whilst Manly had to wait until 2007 for another shot at the title, which was unsuccessful. Manly's next premiership would however come the year after.

Player statistics
The following statistics are as of the conclusion of Round 22.

Top 5 point scorers

Top 5 try scorers

Top 5 goal scorers

Post season

With twenty-two teams playing in two competitions in 1997 crowd attendances and corporate sponsorships were spread very thinly, and many teams found themselves in financial difficulty by the end of the season. Despite having the financial backing of Optus, the Australian Rugby League decided that it was not in the best interests of the game to run two competitions and undertook moves to approach News Limited and invite the traditional clubs back into the main competition. As a consequence of the negotiations that followed, on 23 September 1997 the ARL announced that it was forming a new competition in partnership with News Limited. The NRL was formed from the ARL and Super League competitions.

It was announced that the 1998 season would have 20 teams competing, 19 of the ARL and Super League teams and the Melbourne Storm, who were owned by News Limited. Some of the clubs on both sides of the war were shut down. News decided to close the Hunter Mariners and the financially ruined Western/Perth Reds, who were $10million in debt at the end of 1997, while the ARL decided to close down the South Queensland Crushers, who were also in financial trouble. Additionally, at the end of the following season News Limited would decide to close down the Adelaide Rams and the ARL would close down the Gold Coast Chargers, even though they were one of the few clubs to make a profit during the Super League war.

See also 
1997 State of Origin series

References

External links
 Rugby League Tables – Notes The World of Rugby League
 Rugby League Tables – Season 1997 The World of Rugby League
 Premiership History and Statistics RL1908

National Rugby League seasons
ARL season